Harry William Smith (6 September 1890 – ?) was an English cricketer. He was a right-handed batsman and a right-arm medium-fast bowler who played first-class cricket for Essex. He was born in Mile End.

Smith made his debut for the Essex Second XI at the age of nineteen, and played just three first-class matches before the outbreak of the First World War, his debut coming against Kent in 1912. However, Smith's breakthrough in the team was not to come until 1921, a season in which Essex's form dropped considerably - Smith playing eight first-class matches during the season as a tailender.

Smith achieved one five-wicket innings in his career - one which saw him rooted to Essex's tailend until the end of the 1922 season, after which he quit the game.

References

1890 births
English cricketers
Essex cricketers
Year of death unknown
People from Mile End